Mark Angelo C. Canlas (born June 15, 1986 in Pampanga) is a Filipino former professional basketball player. He was undrafted in the 2011. He was signed by the Clickers before the season began. He was a member of the UST Growling Tigers who won the UAAP title in 2006.

College career
Canlas played for the UST Growling Tigers men's senior basketball team in the University Athletic Association of the Philippines from 2005 to 2008. In 2006, he was one of the members of Growling Tigers who won the title against the heavily favored Ateneo Blue Eagles 2–1.

Shopinas.com Clickers
He was undrafted in the 2011 PBA Draft but was signed by Shopinas.com

References

External links
Mark Canlas Player Profile :: PBA-Online!

1986 births
Living people
Air21 Express players
Basketball players from Pampanga
Filipino men's basketball players
Meralco Bolts players
Power forwards (basketball)
Small forwards
UST Growling Tigers basketball players